Hamilton Township is a township in Atlantic County, in the U.S. state of New Jersey. As of the 2020 United States census, the township's population was 27,484, an increase of 981 (+3.7%) from the 2010 census count of 26,503, which in turn reflected an increase of 6,004 (+29.3%) from the 20,499 counted in the 2000 census. The Township of Hamilton was incorporated by the New Jersey Legislature on February 5, 1813.

The township calls itself "New Jersey's Largest Municipality" on its stationery and its website. At , Hamilton Township has the largest land area of any municipality in New Jersey.

History
Hamilton Township's origins are directly tied to the Great Egg Harbor River and its tributaries which run through it.  George May, after whom the village of Mays Landing was named, built a shipyard and trading post near Babcock Creek in 1756.  By the mid 19th century, Mays Landing reached the height of its shipbuilding.

From 1830 to 1880, more than 200 vessels were built along the Great Egg Harbor River with lumber from native forests and iron from Weymouth foundries. Half of them were produced at Mays Landing.  But by the end of century, wood shipbuilding began to disappear due to the lack of suitable timber. Iron was then substituted for hull construction.

Hamilton was incorporated as a township by an act of the New Jersey Legislature on February 5, 1813, from portions of Egg Harbor Township and Weymouth Township, while the area was still part of Gloucester County. Hamilton became part of the newly created Atlantic County in 1837. Portions of the township were taken to form Hammonton on March 5, 1866, and to form Buena Vista Township on March 5, 1867. The township was named for Alexander Hamilton.

Geography
According to the U.S. Census Bureau, the township had a total area of 112.94 square miles (292.52 km2), including 110.90 square miles (287.22 km2) of land and 2.05 square miles (5.31 km2) of water (1.81%).

Mays Landing, with a 2010 population of 2,135, is a census-designated place located within Hamilton Township that has been the county seat of Atlantic County since it was formed in 1837.

Other unincorporated communities, localities, and places located partially or completely within the township include Mays Landing, the county seat of Atlantic County, and Bears Head, Carmantown, Catawba, Clarktown, Cologne, Dacosta, Emmelsville, Gravelly Run, Lake Lenape, Laureldale, McKee City, Mizpah, Reega, Thompsontown, Weymouth, and Wilsons Landing.

The township borders the Atlantic County municipalities of Buena Vista Township, Egg Harbor Township, Estell Manor, Folsom, Galloway Township, Hammonton, Mullica Township and Weymouth Township.

Pinelands Reserve
The township is one of 56 South Jersey municipalities that are included within the New Jersey Pinelands National Reserve, a protected natural area of unique ecology covering , that has been classified as a United States Biosphere Reserve and established by Congress in 1978 as the nation's first National Reserve. Part of the township is included in the state-designated Pinelands Area, which includes portions of Atlantic County, along with areas in Burlington, Camden, Cape May, Cumberland, Gloucester and Ocean counties.

The western three-quarters of the township is governed by regulation by the New Jersey Pinelands Commission, which places major limitations on development in that portion of the township, which remains as pine forest with a distinctly rural character, with other portions designated as a Rural Development Area. Significant portions of the eastern quarter of the township are designated by the Pinelands Commission as part of the Regional Growth Area (RGA), in which development is "allowed and encouraged" in the area surrounding Atlantic City, New Jersey. The majority of the township's residents live in the area covered by the RGA, which has been developed in suburban fashion and includes shopping areas such as the Hamilton Mall, part of the township's  of first class commercial retail properties.

Demographics

2010 census

The Census Bureau's 2006–2010 American Community Survey showed that (in 2010 inflation-adjusted dollars) median household income was $59,085 (with a margin of error of +/− $3,242) and the median family income was $62,354 (+/− $3,893). Males had a median income of $47,110 (+/− $4,411) versus $36,615 (+/− $3,549) for females. The per capita income for the borough was $25,292 (+/− $1,528). About 8.4% of families and 10.2% of the population were below the poverty line, including 13.1% of those under age 18 and 9.2% of those age 65 or over.

2000 census
As of the 2000 United States census, there were 20,499 people, 7,148 households, and 5,039 families residing in the township. The racial makeup of the township was 71.45% White, 19.26% African American, 0.29% Native American, 3.29% Asian, 0.05% Pacific Islander, 3.33% from other races, and 2.33% from two or more races. Hispanic or Latino of any race were 7.91% of the population.

There were 7,148 households, out of which 37.3% had children under the age of 18 living with them, 50.5% were married couples living together, 15.0% had a female householder with no husband present, and 29.5% were non-families. 22.2% of all households were made up of individuals, and 5.6% had someone living alone who was 65 years of age or older.  The average household size was 2.72 and the average family size was 3.21.

In the township, the population was spread out, with 27.1% under the age of 18, 8.2% from 18 to 24, 35.9% from 25 to 44, 20.7% from 45 to 64, and 8.2% who were 65 years of age or older.  The median age was 34 years. For every 100 females, there were 99.4 males.  For every 100 females age 18 and over, there were 97.7 males.

The median income for a household in the township was $50,259, and the median income for a family was $54,899. Males had a median income of $37,419 versus $30,089 for females. The per capita income for the township was $21,309.  About 4.5% of families and 6.6% of the population were below the poverty line, including 9.1% of those under age 18 and 6.6% of those age 65 or over.

Economy

Balic Winery, established in 1966, produces 27 different wines on a  vineyard.

Parks and recreation
The Great Egg Harbor River and Lake Lenape are recreational resources used by local residents and visitors alike.

Government

Local government 
Hamilton Township is governed under the Township form of New Jersey municipal government, one of 141 municipalities (of the 564) statewide that use this form. The Township Committee is comprised of five members, who are elected directly by the voters at-large in partisan elections to serve three-year terms of office on a staggered basis, with either one or two seats coming up for election each year as part of the November general election in a three-year cycle. At an annual reorganization meeting each January, the Council selects one of its members to serve as Mayor and another as Deputy Mayor.

, the members of the Hamilton Township Committee are Mayor Charles Cain (R, term on committee and as mayor ends December 31, 2022), Deputy Mayor Richard Cheek (R, term on committee ends 2024; term as deputy mayor ends 2020), Susan K. Hopkins (R, 2024), Judith Link (D, 2023) and Carl Pitale (R, 2022).

Federal, state, and county representation 
Hamilton Township is located in the 2nd Congressional District and is part of New Jersey's 2nd state legislative district.

 

Atlantic County is governed by a directly elected county executive and a nine-member Board of County Commissioners, responsible for legislation. The executive serves a four-year term and the commissioners are elected to staggered three-year terms, of which four are elected from the county on an at-large basis and five of the commissioners represent equally populated districts. , Atlantic County's Executive is Republican Dennis Levinson, whose term of office ends December 31, 2023. Members of the Board of County Commissioners are:

Ernest D. Coursey, District 1, including Atlantic City (part), Egg Harbor Township (part), and Pleasantville (D, 2022, Atlantic City), Chair Maureen Kern, District 2, including Atlantic City (part), Egg Harbor Township (part), Linwood, Longport, Margate City, Northfield, Somers Point and Ventnor City (R, 2024, Somers Point), Andrew Parker III, District 3, including Egg Harbor Township (part) and Hamilton Township (part) (R, Egg Harbor Township, 2023), Richard R. Dase, District 4, including Absecon, Brigantine, Galloway Township and Port Republic (R, 2022, Galloway Township), James A. Bertino, District 5, including Buena, Buena Vista Township, Corbin City, Egg Harbor City, Estell Manor, Folsom, Hamilton Township (part), Hammonton, Mullica Township and Weymouth Township (R, 2018, Hammonton), Caren L. Fitzpatrick, At-Large (D, 2023, Linwood), Frank X. Balles, At-Large (R, Pleasantville, 2024) Amy L. Gatto, Freeholder (R, 2022, Hamilton Township) and Vice Chair John W. Risley, At-Large (R, 2023, Egg Harbor Township) 

Atlantic County's constitutional officers are: County Clerk Joesph J. Giralo (R, 2026, Hammonton),  Sheriff Eric Scheffler (D, 2024, Northfield) and 
Surrogate James Curcio (R, 2025, Hammonton).

Politics
As of March 2011, there were a total of 15,486 registered voters in Hamilton Township, of which 4,305 (27.8% vs. 30.5% countywide) were registered as Democrats, 3,541 (22.9% vs. 25.2%) were registered as Republicans and 7,635 (49.3% vs. 44.3%) were registered as Unaffiliated. There were 5 voters registered as Libertarians or Greens. Among the township's 2010 Census population, 58.4% (vs. 58.8% in Atlantic County) were registered to vote, including 76.9% of those ages 18 and over (vs. 76.6% countywide).

In the 2012 presidential election, Democrat Barack Obama received 6,748 votes here (59.9% vs. 57.9% countywide), ahead of Republican Mitt Romney with 4,334 votes (38.5% vs. 41.1%) and other candidates with 130 votes (1.2% vs. 0.9%), among the 11,268 ballots cast by the township's 16,710 registered voters, for a turnout of 67.4% (vs. 65.8% in Atlantic County). In the 2008 presidential election, Democrat Barack Obama received 6,619 votes here (57.7% vs. 56.5% countywide), ahead of Republican John McCain with 4,612 votes (40.2% vs. 41.6%) and other candidates with 148 votes (1.3% vs. 1.1%), among the 11,481 ballots cast by the township's 16,199 registered voters, for a turnout of 70.9% (vs. 68.1% in Atlantic County). In the 2004 presidential election, Democrat John Kerry received 5,055 votes here (51.9% vs. 52.0% countywide), ahead of Republican George W. Bush with 4,507 votes (46.2% vs. 46.2%) and other candidates with 83 votes (0.9% vs. 0.8%), among the 9,747 ballots cast by the township's 13,128 registered voters, for a turnout of 74.2% (vs. 69.8% in the whole county).

In the 2013 gubernatorial election, Republican Chris Christie received 4,086 votes here (59.0% vs. 60.0% countywide), ahead of Democrat Barbara Buono with 2,526 votes (36.5% vs. 34.9%) and other candidates with 127 votes (1.8% vs. 1.3%), among the 6,924 ballots cast by the township's 17,080 registered voters, yielding a 40.5% turnout (vs. 41.5% in the county). In the 2009 gubernatorial election, Republican Chris Christie received 3,346 votes here (47.9% vs. 47.7% countywide), ahead of Democrat Jon Corzine with 3,102 votes (44.4% vs. 44.5%), Independent Chris Daggett with 386 votes (5.5% vs. 4.8%) and other candidates with 93 votes (1.3% vs. 1.2%), among the 6,983 ballots cast by the township's 15,764 registered voters, yielding a 44.3% turnout (vs. 44.9% in the county).

Education 
For pre-kindergarten through eighth grade, public school students attend the Hamilton Township Schools. As of the 2021–22 school year, the district, comprised of three schools, had an enrollment of 2,974 students and 254.4 classroom teachers (on an FTE basis), for a student–teacher ratio of 11.7:1. Schools in the district (with 2021–22 enrollment data from the National Center for Education Statistics) are 
Joseph C. Shaner Memorial School with 628 students in grades K-1, 
George Hess Educational Complex with 1,263 in pre-kindergarten and grades 2-5 and 
William Davies Middle School with 979 students in grades 6-8.

Public school students in ninth through twelfth grades attend Oakcrest High School, located in Hamilton Township, which serves students from Hamilton Township. As of the 2021–22 school year, the high school had an enrollment of 952 students and 87.8 classroom teachers (on an FTE basis), for a student–teacher ratio of 10.8:1. The high school is part of the Greater Egg Harbor Regional High School District, a regional publichigh school district serving students at the district's two other schools, Absegami High School and Cedar Creek High School, from the other constituent districts of Egg Harbor City, Galloway Township and Mullica Township, together with students from the City of Port Republic and Washington Township (in Burlington County), who attend as part of sending/receiving relationships with their respective school districts.

Atlantic County Institute of Technology, established in 1974 and located on a campus covering , provides vocational instruction to high school students and adults from across Atlantic County, and was one of eight schools in the state recognized in 2008 as a National Blue Ribbon School by the United States Department of Education. Township students can also attend the Charter-Tech High School for the Performing Arts, located in Somers Point.

Saint Vincent de Paul Regional School is a Catholic elementary school in Mays Landing, serving students in pre-kindergarten through eighth grade since 1961 and operated under the jurisdiction of the Diocese of Camden.

Atlantic Cape Community College was the second community college to be established in New Jersey, and moved to its campus in Mays Landing in February 1968 where it now serves students from both Atlantic County and Cape May County.

Transportation

Roads and highways

A variety of roads pass through the township. Hamilton hosts a  stretch of the Atlantic City Expressway with three interchanges and the Egg Harbor Tolls. U.S. Route 40, U.S. Route 322, and Route 50 pass through the township. The major county roads include County Route 552, County Route 559, County Route 563, and County Route 575.

Public transportation
NJ Transit provides bus service in the township between Cape May and Philadelphia on the 315 route and to Atlantic City on routes 502 from Atlantic Cape Community College and 553 from Upper Deerfield Township.

Notable people

People who were born in, residents of, or otherwise closely associated with Hamilton Township include:
 Brandon Bell (born 1995), linebacker for the Penn State Nittany Lions football team
 Colin Bell (born 1981), member of the New Jersey Senate who represented the 2nd Legislative District
 Cory Bird (born 1978), safety who played for the Indianapolis Colts
 Ilsley Boone (1879–1968), established and ran the national headquarters of the American Sunbathing Association (ASA) at Sunshine Park (which operated from 1931 to 1983) in Mays Landing
 Darhyl Camper (born 1990), singer-songwriter and record producer
 Suzette Charles (born 1963), singer and entertainer, who became Miss America 1984
 Carmen Cincotti (born 1992), competitive eater
 Darren Drozdov (born 1969), ex-NFL player and retired professional wrestler who competed in the WWF
 Mae Faggs (1932–2000), track-and-field athlete who was a gold medalist in the Women's 4 × 100 meters relay at 1952 Summer Olympics
 Ronnie Faisst (born 1977), professional freestyle motocross and snow bikecross rider
 Harvey Kesselman (born 1951), fifth president of Stockton University
 Walter Lowenfels (1897–1976), poet, journalist, and member of the Communist Party USA who edited the communist newspaper the Daily Worker
 Shameka Marshall (born 1983), long jumper who won the gold medal at the 2007 NACAC Championships in Athletics
 Bo Melton (born 1999), American football wide receiver for the Rutgers Scarlet Knights
 William Moore (1810–1878), served in the United States House of Representatives, where he represented New Jersey's 1st congressional district from 1867 to 1871
 Sharon Kay Penman (born 1945), historical novelist
 Graciela Rivera (1921–2011), first Puerto Rican to sing a lead role at the Metropolitan Opera in New York

References

External links

Official township website

 
1813 establishments in New Jersey
County seats in New Jersey
Populated places established in 1813
Township form of New Jersey government
Townships in Atlantic County, New Jersey